Michael Janyk (born March 22, 1982, in Vancouver) is a Canadian retired alpine skier. Janyk appeared for the Canadian team in the slalom event at the 2006 Winter Olympics, where he finished in 17th place. Janyk has yet to win a World Cup race in his professional career, but has finished second on one occasion, December 3, 2006 in a slalom race in Beaver Creek.

He also won the bronze medal in Slalom in February at the 2009 Alpine Skiing World Championship in Val d'Isère. He announced his retirement from the sport in March 2014.

Along with team-mate Manuel Osborne-Paradis he established the Mike and Manny Foundation, which organises ski camps for children.

His sister Britt Janyk also competes in the alpine skiing World Cup.

References

External links
 
 
 
 

1982 births
Living people
Skiers from Vancouver
Canadian male alpine skiers
Alpine skiers at the 2006 Winter Olympics
Alpine skiers at the 2010 Winter Olympics
Olympic alpine skiers of Canada
Alpine skiers at the 2014 Winter Olympics